Power Tower is a thrill ride located at two Cedar Fair parks in the US, Cedar Point and Valleyfair. The attractions are powered by air in large cylinders in which an aircraft steel cable, connected to the internal piston, travels and is also connected to the external rider car. Hydraulic cylinders at the base of the tower provide an extra measure of safety in case of a ride malfunction. Both rides were designed and manufactured by S&S Worldwide of Logan, Utah.

Cedar Point

Power Tower at Cedar Point is a multi-tower attraction featuring a pair of Space Shot rides and a pair of Turbo Drop rides, arranged in a square-footprint with a crowning marquee and crisscrossed arches joining the four rides at their peaks. Power Tower is the only four-towered drop tower ride in the world to date, devoting two towers to each drop cycle. The ride was announced on August 20, 1997 and opened to guests in 1998.

Sixteen new LED lights from Chauvet Professional were installed on Power Tower before the 2012 season.

Ride specifications
 Height: 275 ft (91 m)
 Drop height: 240 ft (73 m)
 Top speed: 50 mph (80 km/h)
 G-force: min -1.0 g, max +4.0
 Ride Duration: 45 sec
 Capacity: 1,700 rides per hour
 Thrill Rating: 5

Valleyfair

Power Tower at Valleyfair is a multi-tower attraction featuring a pair of Turbo Drop rides and a single Space Shot ride, arranged in a triangular-footprint with a crowning marquee joining the three rides at their peaks.

Power Tower is the tallest ride in Minnesota. The ride was originally intended to be 300 feet (91 m) tall, but the Federal Aviation Administration prohibits Valleyfair's rides from being built taller than  because of the nearby Flying Cloud Airport.

Ride specifications
 Height: 275 ft (84 m)
 Drop height: 250 ft (76 m)
 Top Speed: 50 mph (80 km/h)
 G-force: min -1.0 g, max +4.0
 Ride Duration: 45 sec
 Capacity: 1,300 rides per hour
 Thrill Rating: 5

Records
Cedar Point's Power Tower was the tallest vertical ascending and descending thrill ride upon debut up until July 1998, when Supreme Scream opened at Knott's Berry Farm.

See also
 Supreme Scream

References

External links

 Official page at Cedar Point
 Official page at Valleyfair
 Power Tower Photo Gallery at The Point Online

Amusement rides introduced in 1998
Towers completed in 1998
Amusement rides introduced in 2000
Drop tower rides
Amusement rides manufactured by S&S – Sansei Technologies
Cedar Fair attractions
Valleyfair